Myloplus schomburgkii, also known as the Disk tetra, Disk pacu, Black-ear pacu, Black-band myleus or Black-barred myleus is a species of serrasalmid with a black bar on its side. This species is found in the middle and lower Amazon River basin, Nanay River, upper Orinoco River basin in Brazil, Peru, Venezuela and possibly in Suriname.

Etymology
The fish is named in honor of explorer Robert Hermann Schomburgk (1804-1865), who provided notes and illustration to the describer upon which the description is based as no type specimen is known.

In the aquarium 
This fish is of minor importance as a food fish in addition to its use as an aquarium fish. It prefers a pH of 5.0 to 7.0 and a temperature of 23 to 27 °C (73 to 81 °F). They are related to pacus and piranhas. They primarily eat fruits, small fish, crustaceans, clams and snails. This fish is capable of delivering serious bites.

References

Serrasalmidae
Taxa named by Sir William Jardine
Fish described in 1841
Fish of South America
Fish of Brazil
Fish of Peru